Unity Valkyrie Freeman-Mitford (8 August 1914 – 28 May 1948) was a British socialite, known for her relationship with Adolf Hitler. Both in Great Britain and Germany, she was a prominent supporter of Nazism, fascism and antisemitism, and belonged to Hitler's inner circle of friends. After the declaration of World War II, Mitford attempted suicide in Munich by shooting herself in the head. She survived but was badly injured. She was allowed safe passage back to England but never recovered from the extensive brain damage. She died from meningitis related to the bullet in her brain.

Unity was a member of the Mitford family, and all of her siblings achieved fame and notoriety.

Childhood
Unity Mitford was the fifth of seven children born in London to David Freeman-Mitford, 2nd Baron Redesdale, and his wife, Sydney (1880–1963), daughter of Thomas Gibson Bowles, MP. (The Mitford family is an aristocratic family tracing its origins in Northumberland back to the 11th-century Norman settlement of England.) 

Unity Mitford was conceived in the town of Swastika, Ontario, in Canada, where her family had gold mines.  Her siblings were Nancy (1904–1973), Pamela (1907–1994), Thomas (1909–1945), Diana (1910–2003), Jessica (1917–1996), and Deborah (1920–2014), later the Duchess of Devonshire. The Mitford children lived at Asthall Manor in Asthall, Oxfordshire, and Unity was educated at St Margaret's School, Bushey.

Diana Mosley’s biographer, Jan Dalley, believes that, "Unity found life in her big family very difficult because she came after these cleverer, prettier, more accomplished sisters." While another biographer, David Pryce-Jones, added: "If you come from a ruck of children in a large family, you've got to do something to assert your individuality, and I think through the experience of trying to force her way forward among the sisters and in the family, she decided that she was going to form a personality against everything". It has been speculated that Unity turned to Nazism as a way to distinguish herself within the family. As Dalley states: "I think the desire to shock was very important, it was the way that she made herself special. When she discovered Nazism and discovered that it was a fantastic opportunity to shock everybody in England she’d discovered the best tease of all."

Her younger sister, Jessica, with whom she shared a bedroom, was a dedicated communist. The two drew a chalk line down the middle to divide the room. Jessica's side was decorated with hammer and sickles and pictures of Vladimir Lenin, while Unity's was decorated with swastikas and pictures of Adolf Hitler. Dalley commented "they were kids virtually, you don't know how much it was just a game, a game that became deadly serious in later life."

Social debut
Mitford was a debutante in 1932. That same year her elder sister Diana left her husband to pursue an affair with Oswald Mosley, who had just founded the British Union of Fascists. Their father was furious at the disgrace and forbade any member of the family to see either Diana or "The Man Mosley", as he termed him. Mitford disobeyed and she met with Mosley that summer at a party thrown by Diana where she was promised a party badge. Mosley's son, Nicholas, stated that: "Unity became a very extrovert member of the party, which was her way [...] She joined my father's party and she used to turn up, she used to go around in a black shirt uniform, and she used to turn up at communist meetings and she used to do the fascist salute and heckle the speaker. That was the sort of person she was". He adds that although his father admired Unity's commitment, Mosley felt "She wasn't doing him any good, because she was making an exhibition of herself."

Unity and Diana Mitford travelled to Germany as part of the British delegation from the British Union of Fascists, to the 1933 Nuremberg Rally, seeing Hitler for the first time. Mitford later said, "The first time I saw him I knew there was no one I would rather meet." Biographer Anne de Courcy confirms: "The Nuremberg rally had a profound effect on both Diana and Unity ... Unity was already, as it were, convinced about Hitler, but this turned conviction into worship. From then on she wanted to be near Hitler as much as possible".

Arrival in Germany
Mitford returned to Germany in the summer of 1934, enrolling in a language school in Munich close to the Nazi Party headquarters. Dalley notes "She was obsessed with meeting Hitler, so she really set out to stalk him." Pryce Jones elaborates: 

After ten months, Hitler finally invited her to his table, where they talked for over 30 minutes, with Hitler picking up her bill. In a letter to her father, Mitford wrote: "It was the most wonderful and beautiful [day] of my life. I am so happy that I wouldn't mind a bit, dying. I'd suppose I am the luckiest girl in the world. For me he is the greatest man of all time". Hitler had also become smitten with the young blonde British student. He was struck by her curious connections to the Germanic culture including her middle name, Valkyrie. Mitford's grandfather, Algernon Freeman-Mitford, had been a friend of Richard Wagner, one of Hitler's idols, and had written introductions to two works of Houston Stewart Chamberlain. Dalley says, "Hitler was extremely superstitious, and he believed that Unity was sort of sent to him, it was destined." Mitford subsequently received invitations to party rallies and state occasions, and was described by Hitler as "a perfect specimen of Aryan womanhood."

Hitler and Mitford became close, with Hitler reportedly playing Mitford off against his new girlfriend, Eva Braun, apparently to make her jealous. Braun wrote of Mitford in her diary: "She is known as the Valkyrie and looks the part, including her legs. I the mistress of the greatest man in Germany and the whole world, I sit here waiting while the sun mocks me through the window panes." Braun regained Hitler's attention after an attempted suicide and Mitford learned from this that desperate measures were often needed to capture the Führer's attention.

Mitford attended the Hitler Youth festival in Hesselberg with Hitler's friend Julius Streicher, where she gave a virulently anti-Semitic speech. She subsequently repeated these sentiments in an open letter to Streicher's paper, Der Stürmer, which read: "The English have no notion of the Jewish danger. Our worst Jews work only behind the scenes. We think with joy of the day when we will be able to say England for the English! Out with the Jews! Heil Hitler! P.S. please publish my name in full, I want everyone to know I am a Jew hater." The letter caused public outrage in Britain but Hitler rewarded her with an engraved golden swastika badge, a private box at the 1936 Berlin Olympics, and a ride in a party Mercedes to the Bayreuth Festival.

Inside the inner circle

From this point on, Mitford was inducted into Hitler's inner circle and remained with him for five years. When Hitler announced the Anschluss in 1938, she appeared with him on the balcony in Vienna. She was later arrested in Prague for distributing Nazi propaganda. Pryce Jones reports that "She [Mitford] saw him, it seemed, more than a hundred times, no other English person could have anything like that access to Hitler", and the suspicions of the British SIS were aroused. MI5 officer Guy Liddell wrote in his diary: "Unity Mitford had been in close and intimate contact with the Führer and his supporters for several years, and was an ardent and open supporter of the Nazi regime. She had remained behind after the outbreak of war and her action had come perilously close to high treason." A 1936 report went further, proclaiming her "more Nazi than the Nazis", and stated that she gave the Hitler salute to the British Consul General in Munich, who immediately requested that her passport be impounded. In 1938, Hitler gave her a choice of four apartments in Munich. Mitford is reported to have visited one apartment to discuss her decoration and design plans while the soon-to-be-dispossessed residents, a Jewish couple, sat in the kitchen crying. Immediately prior to this, she had lived in the house of Erna Hanfstaengl, sister of early Hitler admirer and confidante Ernst Hanfstaengl, but was ordered to leave when Hitler became angry with the Hanfstaengls.

Many prominent Nazis were also suspicious of Mitford and her relationship to their Führer. In his memoirs, Inside the Third Reich, Albert Speer said of Hitler's select group: "One tacit agreement prevailed: No one must mention politics. The sole exception was Lady [sic] Mitford, who even in the later years of international tension persistently spoke up for her country and often actually pleaded with Hitler to make a deal with Britain. In spite of Hitler's discouraging reserve, she did not abandon her efforts through all those years". Mitford summered at the Berghof where she continued to discuss a possible German-British alliance with Hitler, going so far as to supply lists of potential supporters and enemies.

At the 1939 Bayreuth Festival, Hitler warned Unity and her sister Diana that war with Britain was inevitable within weeks and they should return home. Diana returned to England, while Unity chose to remain in Germany, though her family sent pleas for her to come home. After Britain's declaration of war on Germany on 3 September 1939, Unity was distraught. Diana Mitford told an interviewer in 1999: "She told me that if there was a war, which of course we all terribly hoped there might not be, that she would kill herself because she couldn't bear to live and see these two countries tearing each other to pieces, both of which she loved." On the morning of 3 September she visited the Gauleiter Adolf Wagner to inquire if she would be detained as an enemy alien, receiving assurances from Wagner that she would not. He was concerned by her demeanour and assigned two men to follow her, but she managed to shake them off by the time she entered the English Garden in Munich, where she took a pearl-handled pistol given to her by Hitler for protection and shot herself in the head. She survived the suicide attempt, and was hospitalised in Munich, where Hitler frequently visited her. He paid her bills and arranged for her return home.

Return to Great Britain
In December 1939, Mitford was moved to a hospital in Bern in the neutral country of Switzerland, where her mother and youngest sister, Deborah, went to collect her. In a 2002 letter to The Guardian, Deborah relates the experience: "We were not prepared for what we found – the person lying in bed was desperately ill. She had lost , was all huge eyes and matted hair, untouched since the bullet went through her skull. The bullet was still in her head, inoperable the doctor said. She could not walk, talked with difficulty and was a changed personality, like one who had had a stroke. Not only was her appearance shocking, she was a stranger, someone we did not know. We brought her back to England in an ambulance coach attached to a train. Every jolt was agony to her."

Stating she could remember nothing of the incident, Mitford returned to England with her mother and sister in January 1940 amid a flurry of press interest and her comment, "I'm glad to be in England, even if I'm not on your side", led to public calls for her internment as a traitor. Due to the intervention by Home Secretary John Anderson, at the behest of her father, she was left to live out her days with her mother at the family home at Swinbrook, Oxfordshire. Under the care of Professor Hugh Cairns, neurosurgeon at the Nuffield Hospital in Oxford, "She learned to walk again, but never fully recovered. She was incontinent and childish." Her mental age was likened to that of a 10 year old, or a "sophisticated child" as James Lees-Milne called her (although he continues that she was "still very amusing in that Mitford manner"). She had a tendency to talk incessantly, had trouble concentrating her mind, and showed an unusually large appetite with sloppy table manners. Lees-Milne observed her to be "rather plain and fat, and says she weighs ". She did however, retain at least some of her devotion to the Nazi party; her family friend Billa Harrod recalled Unity stating that she wished to have children and name the eldest Adolf.

Up to 11 September 1941, Mitford was reported to have had an affair with RAF Pilot Officer John Andrews, a test pilot, who was stationed at the nearby RAF Brize Norton. MI5 learned of this and reported it to Home Secretary Herbert Morrison in October. He had heard that she "drives about the countryside … and picks up airmen, etc, and … interrogates them." Andrews, a former bank clerk and a married father, was "removed as far away as the limited extent of the British Isles permits." He was re-posted to the far north of Scotland where he died in a Spitfire crash in 1945. Authorities then concluded that Mitford did not pose a significant threat!

From 1943, she also spent long periods in Hillmorton, an area of Rugby in Warwickshire, staying with the local vicar and his family. Mitford was keen to visit her sister Diana in Holloway Prison, and Norah Elam offered to look after Mitford at their home in Logan Place for a short period. Norah Elam and her husband Dudley escorted Mitford to see Diana and Oswald Mosley in Holloway on 18 March 1943.

Death

Mitford was taken seriously ill on a visit to the family-owned island of Inch Kenneth and was taken to hospital in Oban. Doctors had decided it was too dangerous to remove the bullet in her head. On 28 May 1948, Mitford died of meningitis caused by the cerebral swelling around the bullet.  She was buried at Swinbrook Churchyard. The inscription on her gravestone reads: "Say not the struggle naught availeth."

Controversies

Allegations of a faked shooting
On 1 December 2002, following the release of declassified documents (including the diary of wartime MI5 officer Guy Liddell), investigative journalist Martin Bright published an article in The Observer that claimed Home Secretary John Anderson intervened to prevent Mitford being questioned on her return from Germany. He also alleged that the shooting, which "has become part of the Mitford myth," may have been invented to excuse this.

In the article Bright pointed out that press photographers and other observers that witnessed Mitford's return, and "her entourage" that he claims included other known Nazi supporters, to Britain on 3 January 1940 said that, "there were no outward signs of her injury". Liddell's diary entry for 2 January states, "We had no evidence to support the press allegations that she was in a serious state of health and it might well be that she was brought in on a stretcher in order to avoid publicity and unpleasantness to her family." He had wanted to search her upon her return but had been prevented from doing so by the Home Secretary. On 8 January, Liddell notes receiving a report from the Security Control Officers who were responsible for meeting the arrivals that states "there were no signs of a bullet wound."

Mitford's cousin, Rupert Mitford, 6th Baron Redesdale, replied to the accusations by saying, "I love conspiracy theories but it goes a little far to suggest Unity was faking it. But people did wonder how she was up on her feet so soon after shooting herself in the head." Unity's sister, Deborah, rebutted by stating that the entourage that returned with Unity consisted of herself and their mother and although she could not remember them being searched upon return, that Unity "could not walk, talked with difficulty and was a changed personality, like one who had had a stroke", and that she has detailed records from Professor Cairns, neurosurgeon at the Nuffield Hospital in Oxford, on her condition, including X-rays showing the bullet.

In a later article for New Statesman, Bright states, "In fact, Liddell was wrong about her injuries. She had indeed shot herself and later died of an infection caused by the bullet in the brain."

Rumours of Hitler's baby
In December 2007, Bright published an article in New Statesman stating that following a previous article on Unity Mitford, he had received a phone call from a Ms Val Hann, a member of the public, offering new information on the story. The caller said that during the war, her aunt, Betty Norton, had run Hill View Cottage, a private maternity hospital in Oxford where Mitford had been a client. According to Hann's family legend, passed from Betty to Val's mother and then on to Val herself, Mitford had checked into the hospital after her return to England where she had given birth to Hitler's child, who was subsequently given up for adoption. Bright states he was initially sceptical.

Bright traveled to Wigginton where the current owner of Hill View confirmed that Norton had indeed run the cottage as a maternity hospital during the war. Bright met with elderly village resident Audrey Smith, whose sister had worked at Hill View. She confirmed seeing "Unity wrapped in a blanket and looking very ill" but insisted that she was there to recover from a nervous breakdown and not to give birth. Bright also contacted Unity's sister Deborah who denounced the villager's gossip and claimed she could produce her mother's diaries to prove it. Bright returned to the National Archives where he found a file on Unity sealed under the 100-year rule. He received special permission to open it and discovered that in October 1941, while living at the family home in Swinbrook, she had been consorting with a married RAF test pilot – throwing doubt on her reported invalidity.

Bright then abandoned the investigation, until he mentioned the story to an executive from Channel 4 who thought it was a good subject for a documentary film. Further investigation was then undertaken as part of the filming for Hitler's British Girl. This included a visit to an Oxfordshire register office, showing an abnormally large number of birth registrations at Hill View at that time, apparently confirming its use as a maternity hospital. No records were found for Mitford, although the records officer stated many births were not registered at this time. The publication of the article and the broadcast of the film the following week stimulated media speculation that Hitler's child could be living in the United Kingdom.

In popular culture

Unity, a play by John Mortimer depicting Mitford's time in Berlin, was broadcast on BBC Two on 20 March 1981. Unity was played by Lesley-Anne Down.

Unity Mitford is mentioned in Breakfast at Tiffany's by Truman Capote. Rutherford ("Rusty") Trawler, apparently was supposed to propose to Unity Mitford before the war, if Hitler had not.

See also
 The Mitfords: Letters Between Six Sisters

References

Further reading
 
 Pryce-Jones, David; Unity Mitford: A Quest (W&N, 1995) ; Unity Mitford: An Enquiry into Her Life and the Frivolity of Evil (Dial Press, 1977) 
 

1914 births
1948 deaths
British anti-communists
English fascists
British Union of Fascists politicians
British socialites
Deaths from meningitis
Neurological disease deaths in Scotland
Infectious disease deaths in Scotland
Daughters of barons
Unity
Nazis from outside Germany
People educated at St Margaret's School, Bushey
British expatriates in Germany